In Greek mythology, Terpsichore ("delight in dancing") is one of the nine Muses and goddess of dance and chorus. She lends her name to the word "terpsichorean", which means "of or relating to dance".

Appearance 
Terpsichore is usually depicted sitting down, holding a lyre, accompanying the dancers' choirs with her music. Her name comes from the Greek words τέρπω ("delight") and χoρός ("dance").

Family 
Tradition portrays Terpsichore as the mother of the Sirens (including Parthenope) by the river-god Achelous. In some accounts, she bore the Thracian king Biston by Ares. By another river-god, Strymon, Terpsichore mothered the Thracian king Rhesus.

In popular culture

Historical
The British 32-gun frigate  commanded by Captain Bowen participated in the Battle of Santa Cruz de Tenerife (1797).

Places
 Terpsichore is the name of a street in New Orleans' historic neighborhoods of Faubourg Lafayette and the Lower Garden District. It runs alongside Euterpe and Melpomene streets, also named for Greek muses.
 Terpsichorean is the name of the Choreography Society of Hans Raj College, University of Delhi.
 Terpsichore is the name of the Mississippi State University Dance Theatre Company in Starkville Mississippi.

Literature
Terpsichore figures among her sisters in Hesiod's Theogony.
When The Histories of Herodotus were divided by later editors into nine books, each book was named after a Muse. Terpsichore was the name of the fifth book.
 The character of Wilkins Micawber, Esq, Jr. is described as a "votary of Terpsichore", in an Australian newspaper brought to London by Dan Peggotty in 1850 novel David Copperfield by Charles Dickens.
T. S. Eliot in the poem Jellicle Cats from Old Possum's Book of Practical Cats (1939), refers to the "terpsichorean powers Jellicle Cats as they dance by the light of the Jellicle Moon.
 Terpischore "Choral Dance" is the name of a chapter in Theresa Cha's Dictee.
 "Some Terpsichore" is the title of a short story in a 2014 book, Thunderstruck and Other Stories, by Elizabeth McCracken.
 Terpsichore is referenced in George Orwell's first novel Burmese Days (1934) in a dialogue by one of the minor characters, Mr. Macgegror.
 Terpsichore Station is the name of a mining facility in the Star Wars novel Phasma by Delilah S. Dawson
Terpsichore is the immortal parent of Russian Jewish demigod Lavinia Asimov in Rick Riordan's Trials of Apollo series.

Music and dance

Terpsichore (1612) is the title of a large collection of dance tunes collected by Michael Praetorius, some originating with Pierre-Francisque Caroubel and some later adapted for wind ensemble by Bob Margolis.
Terpsichore is also found in François Couperin's "Second Ordre" from the Pièces de clavecin.
The third version (HWV 8c) of Handel's opera Il pastor fido (1712) includes a new prologue written in 1734 titled Terpsicore.
 Terpsichore is a role in George Balanchine's ballet Apollo.
 The eighteenth century French dancer and courtesan Marie-Madeleine Guimard named the private theater in her private palace (1766) the Temple of Terpsichore.
 The German-South African singer and composer Ike Moriz entitled his 2012 Jazz and Swing album "Siren Terpsichore" which includes his song of the same name.

Media
In the 1947 film Down To Earth, Rita Hayworth plays Terpsichore, who is annoyed and visits Earth to change a musical that depicts her in a bad light.
Olivia Newton-John plays the muse Terpsichore as "Kira" in the 1980 film Xanadu, a film inspired by Down To Earth.
Terpsichore is featured as a character in the 1997 Disney animated film Hercules. She appears in the Hercules animated series and plays an active role in the episode Hercules and the Muse of Dance, where she tutors Hercules on his dancing to pass in phys ed.
In Monty Python’s Cheese Shop Sketch, John Cleese refers to the Terpsichorean muse.

Science
 Terpsichore, a genus of ferns in the family Polypodiaceae, subfamily Grammitidoideae named after the Muse

See also
 Muse
 Muses in popular culture
 The asteroid 81 Terpsichore

References

External links

Warburg Institute Iconographic Database (ca 40 images of Terpsichore)

Greek Muses
Music and singing goddesses
Women of Ares
Women of Apollo
Children of Zeus
Thraco-Macedonian mythology
Dance in Greek mythology
Metamorphoses characters
Dance goddesses
Wisdom goddesses
Music in Greek mythology